Biggest Fan may refer to:

 The Biggest Fan, a 2002 film by Michael Criscione and Michael Meyer starring Chris Trousdale from the boy band Dream Street
 "Biggest Fan", a 2012 song by American hard rock band Call Me No One
 "Biggest Fan", a 2012 song by American singer Chris Brown from his fifth studio album Fortune
 Your Biggest Fan, a 2006 EP by indie pop band Voxtrot
 "Your Biggest Fan", a 2010 song by American singer Nick Jonas featuring China Anne McClain
 Ke Hobe Biggest Fan, a Bengali talk show hosted by Anurag Basu

See also 
 Stan, a term for an overly-obsessed fan.
 Fan (person), a fanatic or an admirer who is enthusiastically fixated over a thing or a famous person.
 Fandom